Bill Cody (1846–1917) or Buffalo Bill was American frontiersman and showman.

Bill or William Cody may also refer to:

 Bill Cody (actor) (1891–1948), Hollywood B-movie actor
 Bill Cody Jr. (1925–1989), child actor and son of the above
 Bill Cody (rugby union) (1892–1968), rugby union player who represented Australia
 Bill Cody (hurler) (1915–2001), Irish hurler
 Bill Cody (American football) (born 1944), former National Football League linebacker
 William Francis Cody (1916–1978), American architect